Cham Reyhan (also Romanized as Cham Reyḩān, Cham-e Reyḩān, and Cham Reihan) is a village in Margha Rural District, in the Central District of Izeh County, Khuzestan Province, Iran. At the 2006 census, its population was 87, in 22 families.

References 

Populated places in Izeh County